Aymond (foaled 1927 in Ontario) was a Canadian Thoroughbred racehorse best known for winning the 1930 King's Plate.

Bred by Whitby, Ontario's James Heffering, he was out of the mare, Ablaze, and sired by Roselyon, a son of the 1911 Epsom Derby winner and British Horseracing Hall of Fame inductee, Sunstar. Aymond was first purchased by Frank O'Connor who subsequently sold him in a 1929 dispersal for $1,025 to Toronto businessman Ryland New who had won the 1927 King's Plate with Troutlet.

Trained by Jack Hutton, Aymond's best result at age two was a third-place finish in the Coronation Futurity Stakes. At age three, he won the seventy-first running of the King's Plate, the most prestigious race in Canada. Sent off at 14:1 odds, eighteen-year-old jockey Henry Little aboard Aymond took the lead at the start and never relinquished it as he held off the heavy favorite Whale Bone to win the 1 mile event by a full-length.

References
 Aymond's pedigree and partial racing stats
 Cauz, Louis E. The Plate, A Royal Tradition. (1984) Deneau Publishers 

1927 racehorse births
Racehorses bred in Ontario
Racehorses trained in Canada
King's Plate winners
Thoroughbred family 1-d